Jonathan Maximiliano Sabbatini Perfecto (born 31 March 1988) is a Uruguayan footballer who plays as a midfielder for Swiss Super League side FC Lugano.

Personal life
Sabbatini was born in Uruguay and is of Italian descent, and holds an Italian passport.

Career statistics

Honours
Lugano
Swiss Cup: 2021–22; runner-up: 2015–16
Swiss Challenge League: 2014–15

External links

 Tuttocalciatori profile

References

1988 births
Living people
Footballers from Paysandú
Association football midfielders
Uruguayan footballers
Uruguayan people of Italian descent
Uruguayan expatriate footballers
S.S. Virtus Lanciano 1924 players
S.S. Chieti Calcio players
FC Lugano players
Serie C players
Serie D players
Swiss Super League players
Swiss Challenge League players
Expatriate footballers in Italy
Expatriate footballers in Switzerland
Uruguayan expatriate sportspeople in Italy
Uruguayan expatriate sportspeople in Switzerland